Mondia is a genus of flowering plants belonging to the family Apocynaceae.

Its native range is Tropical and Southern Africa.

Species:

Mondia ecornuta 
Mondia whitei

References

Apocynaceae
Apocynaceae genera